Baron Swaythling, of Swaythling in the County of Southampton, is a title in the Peerage of the United Kingdom. It was created in 1907 for the British Jewish  Liberal politician, banker and  philanthropist, Sir Samuel Montagu, 1st Baronet. He had already been created a Baronet, of South Stoneham House in the County of Southampton and of Kensington Palace Gardens in the County of London, in 1894. , the titles are held by his great-great-grandson, the fifth Baron, who succeeded his father in 1998.

Several other members of the family may also be mentioned. The Hon. Edwin Samuel Montagu, second son of the first Baron, was a Liberal politician and the husband of Venetia Stanley. The medical researcher Philip D'Arcy Hart was the grandson of the first Baron. The Hon. Ewen Montagu, second son of the second Baron, was a judge, writer and intelligence officer, famous for conceptualizing Operation Mincemeat. The Hon. Ivor Montagu, third son of the second Baron, was a film maker. Also, the first Baron was the uncle of the Liberal Member of Parliament Sir Stuart Samuel, 1st Baronet Samuel, and of Liberal politician Herbert Samuel, 1st Viscount Samuel.

Barons Swaythling (1907)
Samuel Montagu, 1st Baron Swaythling (1832–1911)
Louis Samuel Montagu, 2nd Baron Swaythling (1869–1927)
Stuart Albert Montagu, 3rd Baron Swaythling (1898–1990)
David Charles Samuel Montagu, 4th Baron Swaythling (1928–1998)
Charles Edgar Samuel Montagu, 5th Baron Swaythling (born 1954)

The heir presumptive is the present holder's first cousin, Rupert Anthony Samuel Montagu (born 1965), grandson of the 3rd Baron through his younger son, the Hon. Anthony Trevor Samuel Montagu (1931–2010).
The heir presumptive's heir apparent is his eldest son, Henry George Samuel Montagu (born 2008).

Male-line family tree

See also
Viscount Samuel
Samuel baronets
Swaythling

Notes

References 
 

Baronies in the Peerage of the United Kingdom
Noble titles created in 1907
Noble titles created for UK MPs
Southampton